José Vítor Roque Júnior (born 31 August 1976), more commonly known as Roque Júnior, is a Brazilian football pundit  and former player who played as a defender. 

He won 48 caps for Brazil and was part of the winning squad at the 2002 World Cup. He is one of four players that have won the Copa Libertadores, the Champions League and the World Cup; the others are his fellow Brazilians Ronaldinho, Cafu and Dida.

Club career
Roque Júnior was born in Santa Rita do Sapucaí. During his career, he played for Santarritense, São José, Palmeiras, AC Milan, Leeds United, Siena, Bayer Leverkusen, MSV Duisburg and Qatari side Al-Rayyan. He is an iconic footballer for Palmeiras, as he played more than 200 competitive games for them. His greatest success in club football came playing for Palmeiras, with whom he won the 1999 Copa Libertadores and with A.C. Milan winning the 2002–03 UEFA Champions League. In the Champions League final he heroically played most of the extra-time carrying a severe injury.

There was excitement at Elland Road when Peter Reid brought Roque to Leeds on loan, but it was short lived as the team conceded 25 times in his seven appearances, failing to win and suffering six defeats with Roque being sent off on his home debut against Birmingham City. However, he did score two goals in a League Cup game against Manchester United (Leeds lost 3–2) but his spell at Leeds was not considered a success.

In September 2008, Palmeiras have signed him from Al-Rayyan on loan until the end of the season.

After leaving Palmeiras in November 2008, he was offered to Australian A-League clubs in April and was in talks with Avaí gaffer Paulo Silas in July, but nothing materialised out of it. In February 2010, Ituano signed the former Brazil international, who had last played in 2008 for Palmeiras.

International career
Roque Júnior was successful on the international stage for Brazil, having played 48 games (two of them unofficial) and scored two goals, and also captaining them on a number of occasions. He was a starter in the 2002 FIFA World Cup winning campaign, forming the back line with Lúcio and Edmílson. He was later called up for the 2005 FIFA Confederations Cup, but did not make it into the squad for the 2006 FIFA World Cup due to injury. He made his last international appearance in 2005 and announced his retirement on 4 September 2007.

Personal life
Roque Júnior is devoted to helping São José Esporte Clube's youth players with a project called "Projeto Primeira Camisa" ("Project First Jersey").

Roque Júnior was the most popular host of Total Request Live on Brazil MTV (BMTV) during his 10-year stint (2005–2015).

Management and coaching
In 2015, Roque Júnior took his first managerial role at XV de Piracicaba.

Career statistics

International

Scores and results list Brazil's goal tally first, score column indicates score after each Roque Júnior goal.

Honours
Palmeiras
 Campeonato Paulista: 1996, 2008
 Copa do Brasil: 1998
 Copa Mercosur: 1998
 Copa Libertadores: 1999
 Torneio Rio – São Paulo: 2000

Milan
UEFA Champions League: 2002–03
Coppa Italia: 2002–03
Brazil
 FIFA World Cup: 2002
 FIFA Confederations Cup: 2005

References

External links
 
 
 Who's who - Roque Junior Leverkusen.com

1976 births
Living people
Sportspeople from Minas Gerais
Association football defenders
Brazilian footballers
Brazilian football managers
Brazil international footballers
Campeonato Brasileiro Série A players
Serie A players
Premier League players
Bundesliga players
2002 FIFA World Cup players
2005 FIFA Confederations Cup players
Copa Libertadores-winning players
FIFA World Cup-winning players
FIFA Confederations Cup-winning players
São José Esporte Clube players
Sociedade Esportiva Palmeiras players
A.C. Milan players
Leeds United F.C. players
A.C.N. Siena 1904 players
Bayer 04 Leverkusen players
MSV Duisburg players
Al-Rayyan SC players
Ituano FC players
Esporte Clube XV de Novembro (Piracicaba) managers
Ituano FC managers
UEFA Champions League winning players
Brazilian expatriate footballers
Brazilian expatriate sportspeople in Italy
Expatriate footballers in Italy
Brazilian expatriate sportspeople in Germany
Expatriate footballers in Germany
Brazilian expatriate sportspeople in England
Expatriate footballers in England